NGC 470 is a spiral galaxy in the constellation Pisces. Located approximately 91 million lightyears from Earth, it was discovered by Friedrich Wilhelm Herschel in 1784. The galaxy also weakly interacts with NGC 474.

Gallery

See also 
 List of galaxies
 List of spiral galaxies

References

External links 
 
 Deep Sky Catalog
 SEDS

470
Pisces (constellation)
Unbarred spiral galaxies
Discoveries by William Herschel
004777